The French National Institute of Nuclear and Particle Physics (French: Institut national de physique nucléaire et de physique des particules, IN2P3) is the coordinating body for nuclear and particle physics in France. It was established in 1971 as a division of the French National Centre for Scientific Research (CNRS). Its purpose is "to promote and unite research activities in the various fields of physics".

List of IN2P3 institutes

Strasbourg 
 The Hubert Curien Multi-disciplinary Institute (l'Institut Pluridisciplinaire Hubert Curien, IPHC)

Annecy 
 The Annecy Particle Physics Laboratory (le Laboratoire d'Annecy de physique des particules, LAPP) at the University of Savoy

Lyon 
 The Institute of Nuclear Physics of Lyon (l'Institut de physique nucléaire de Lyon, IPNL) at Claude Bernard University Lyon 1
 The IN2P3 Computing Centre (le Centre de calcul, CC-IN2P3)
 The Advanced Materials Laboratory (le Laboratoire des matériaux avancés, LMA)

Modane 
 The Modane Underground Laboratory (le Laboratoire souterrain de Modane, LSM)

Grenoble 
 The Laboratory of Subatomic Physics and Cosmology (le Laboratoire de physique subatomique et de cosmologie de Grenoble, LPSC) at the Université Grenoble Alpes

Marseille 
 The Centre for Particle Physics of Marseille (le Centre de physique des particules de Marseille, CPPM) at Aix-Marseille University

Montpellier 
 (le Laboratoire Univers et Particules de Montpellier, LUPM) at the University of Montpellier

Clermont-Ferrand 
 The Clermont Physics Laboratory (le Laboratoire de physique de Clermont, LPC Clermont) at the University of Clermont Auvergne

Bordeaux 
 Centre of Nuclear Studies of Bordeaux-Gradignan (le Centre d'études nucléaires de Bordeaux Gradignan, CENBG) at the University of Bordeaux

Nantes 
 The Laboratory of Subatomic Physics and Associated Technologies (le Laboratoire de physique subatomique et des technologies associées, SUBATECH) at the University of Nantes

Caen 
 The National Large Heavy Ion Accelerator (le Grand accélérateur national d'ions lourds, GANIL)
 The Caen Particle Physics Laboratory (le Laboratoire de physique corpusculaire, LPC Caen) at ENSICAEN, associated with Normandy University and University of Caen Normandy.

Paris 
 The Astroparticle and Cosmology Laboratory (le laboratoire AstroParticule et Cosmologie, APC) at Paris Diderot University
 The Laboratory of Nuclear and High-Energy Physics (le Laboratoire de physique nucléaire et des hautes énergies, LPNHE) at Pierre and Marie Curie University and Paris Diderot University
 (le Musée Curie et les archives de l'Institut du radium)

Orsay 
 The Institute of Physics of the two Infinities Irène Joliot-Curie (Institut de physique des deux infinis Irène Joliot-Curie, IJCLab) at the Paris-Saclay University

Palaiseau 
 The Laboratoire Leprince-Ringuet Laboratory (le Laboratoire Leprince-Ringuet, LLR) at École Polytechnique

References

External links 
 

Research institutes in France
Physics institutes
French National Centre for Scientific Research
Research institutes established in 1971
1971 establishments in France